Mads Andenæs KC (also spelt Andenas, born 27 July 1957) is a legal academic and former UN special rapporteur on arbitrary detention and the chair of UN Working Group on Arbitrary Detention. He is a professor at the Faculty of Law of the University of Oslo, the former director of the British Institute of International and Comparative Law, London and the former director of the Centre of European Law at King’s College, University of London.

In 2019, Andenæs was made Queen's Counsel honoris causa. He holds the degrees of Cand. Jur. (University of Oslo), Ph.D. (University of Cambridge) and M.A. and D.Phil. (University of Oxford), the Oxford degrees being awarded ad eundem gradum.

Andenæs is a research fellow of the Institute of European and Comparative Law, University of Oxford and a senior research fellow at the Institute of Advanced Legal Studies, University of London.

He was visiting professor at University of Paris I (Sorbonne) in 2006 and University of Rome La Sapienza in 2002–2009. In 2002–2003 he held the Chaire W J Ganshof van der Meersch under the Fondation Philippe Wiener–Maurice Anspach at the Université Libre de Bruxelles. In 2005 he was a fellow of Netherlands Institute for Advanced Study in the Humanities and Social Sciences. In 2006 he delivered the Annual Guido Carli Lecture at the University of LUISS Guido Carli, Rome. In 2008–2009 he delivered a series of lectures at l'École normale Supérieure, Paris om human rights and comparative law.

He has been the general editor of the International and Comparative Law Quarterly (Cambridge University Press), the general editor of European Business Law Review (Kluwer Law International) and on the editorial boards of ten other law journals and book series, including the Nijhoff Series on International Trade Law.

He is an advisory editor of the University of Bologna Law Review, a generalist student-edited law journal published by the Department of Legal Studies of the University of Bologna.

He is an honorary fellow of the Society of Legal Studies (UK), a Fellow of the International Academy of Commercial and Consumer Law (where he is a member of the board), an Honorary Fellow of the British Institute of International and Comparative Law, and a Fellow of The Royal Society of the Arts.

He was the Secretary General of the Fédération internationale de droit européen 2000–2002, the Hon Secretary of the UK Association of European Law 1997–2008 and the Hon Secretary of the UK Committee of Comparative Law 1999–2005. He was the Chair, Association of Human Rights Institutes in 2008. Since 2009 Andenas has been a member of the UN Working Group on Arbitrary Detention.

Field of research
Andenas is involved in research projects concerning European private law, including company law, the relationship between national law and European and international law, comparative constitutional and human rights law and constitutional aspects of the EU and the WTO. One main current research interest is the role of rule of law and rights concepts in the implementation of international human rights standards and the development of court remedies.

References

External links
United Nations Working Group on Arbitrary Detention
http://www.jus.uio.no/ifp/english/people/aca/msandena/
University of London entry
University of Leicester entry
British Institute of International and Comparative Law

1957 births
Living people
Alumni of the University of Oxford
Academics of King's College London
British non-fiction writers
Academic staff of the University of Paris
British male writers
Male non-fiction writers